Rogstad is a surname. Notable people with the surname include:

Anna Rogstad (1854–1938), Norwegian educator, women's rights activist and politician
Henrik Rogstad (1916–1945), Norwegian politician
Olaf Rogstad (1877–1969), Norwegian engineer and civil servant
Solveig Rogstad (born 1982), Norwegian biathlete